Vincent Gordon Crisp (30 April 1910 – 10 October 1980) was an Australian rules footballer who played with Carlton in the Victorian Football League (VFL).

Notes

External links 

Gordon Crisp's profile at Blueseum

1910 births
Carlton Football Club players
Australian rules footballers from Victoria (Australia)
1980 deaths